Tutak Rural District is in Isar District of Marvast County, Yazd province, Iran. The constituent villages of the rural district were in Marvast District of Khatam County until the district was raised to the status of a county and split into two districts: the Central District and Isar District. The latter was split into two rural districts, one of which was the newly created Tutak Rural District, with the village of Tutak as its capital. The village had a population of 420 at the National Census of 2016.

References 

Rural Districts of Yazd Province

Populated places in Yazd Province

fa:دهستان توتک